Bogdan Siorek was a Polish footballer who played as a defender. 
Starting his career in his hometown club Resovia, he won 2 promotions within two seasons of being in the team, one of the most successful periods in the club's history, having played 243 matches scoring 7 goals for them in the Second Division.

He then moved to Stal Stalowa Wola, where he made 27 appearances in the top division before spending another season with them after being relegated. He finished his playing career with amateur Austrian club USV Furth from Furth bei Göttweig.

After retirement he stayed in Austria doing various jobs, such as at the Föhrenwald Golf club in Lanzenkirchen. He had family ties to Tarnobrzeg, was married and died on 27 April 2020.

References

External links
Bogdan Siorek - 90minut.pl profile
 Bogdan Siorek - Wikiliga.pl profile
 Bogdan Siorek Footballdatabase.eu profile

1957 births
2020 deaths
People from Rzeszów
Polish footballers
Association football defenders